The Greater Lansing Activities Conference was formed in 2014 by seven teams from the Lansing area including Ingham, Eaton, Barry, and Shiawassee Counties.

Michigan high school sports conferences
2014 establishments in Michigan